Chamberlineptus morechalensis,  the sole species of the genus Chamberlineptus is a spirostreptid millipede from Venezuela. C. morechalensis was described in 1954 by Nell B. Causey, described as similar to the spirostrpetid Andineptus in the structure of the gonopods (male reproductive appendages). However, J. M. Demange (1970) and Jean-Paul Mauriès (1975) considered both Chamberlineptus and Andineptus to be taxonomic synonyms, or at least subgenera, of Orthoporus.

References

Spirostreptida
Millipedes of South America
Invertebrates of Venezuela
Monotypic arthropod genera